General Beg may refer to:

Aslamas Beg (fl. 1690s), Safavid military commander
Mirza Aslam Beg (born 1931), Pakistan Army four-star general
Otar Beg (c. 1583–1662/63), Safavid military commander
Siyavosh Beg (qollar-aghasi) (fl. 1640s–1650s), Safavid military commander
Tardi Beg (fl. 1650s), Mughal Empire military commander